The Kuloy is a river in Pinezhsky and Mezensky Districts of Arkhangelsk Oblast in Russia. Its mouth is located in the Mezen Bay of the White Sea. The principal tributaries of the Kuloy are the Kyolda (left), the Nemnyuga (right), and the Soyana (left).

In the low course, the Sotka approaches the middle course of the Pinega and passes within several kilometers from the Pinega. In this place, close to the settlement of Pinega, the Kuloy-Pinega Canal was constructed in 1926—1928, however, currently the canal is pretty much neglected. Below the mouth of the canal the river is known as the Kuloy; above the mouth, the river is known as the Sotka. The lower  of the course of Kuloy, downstream from the selo of Kulogory, are navigable; the course adjacent to the canal is not navigable anymore. There is no passenger navigation on the Kuloy.

The river basin of the Kuloy is huge and includes almost all the area in the north-east of Arkhangelsk Oblast between the White Sea and the Mezen and Pinega rivers. This area is spread over five districts, Pinezhsky, Mezensky, Primorsky, and minor areas in Leshukonsky and Kholmogorsky Districts.

From the confluence of the canal, the Kuloy flows north, crosses from Pinezhsky District into Mezensky District, where it accepts the Nemnyuga from the right. Below the mouth of the Soyana, the valley of the Kuloy starts broadening and turns into the estuary, which turns north-east and enters the Mezen Bay. The selo of Dolgoshchelye is located at the right bank of the estuary.

History
The area was populated by Finnic peoples and then colonized by the Novgorod Republic. In the 13th century the Novgorod merchants already reached the White Sea. The Kuloy was used by Novgorod merchants as the trading route to the basin of the Pechora.  
From the Northern Dvina, they went upstream the Pinega and took the boats by land to the Kuloy at the place where the canal now is. The boats then were taken from the Kuloy to the Mezen.

The selo of Dolgoshchelye, in the estuary of the Kuloy, is a historical pomor fishermen village.

References

External links

Rivers of Arkhangelsk Oblast